The UMass Lowell River Hawks women's basketball team represents the University of Massachusetts Lowell in Lowell, Massachusetts, United States. The River Hawks started play in NCAA Division I beginning in 2013 and joined the America East Conference. As part of their transition from Division II to Division I, they were not eligible for postseason play until the 2017–2018 season.

Season-by-season record
{| class="wikitable"

|- align="center"

Postseason

NCAA Division II Tournament results

References

External links